William Newby (26 October 1855 – 2 August 1921) was a South African first-class cricketer. He played for Transvaal in the 1889–90 Currie Cup.

References

External links
 

1855 births
1921 deaths
South African cricketers
Gauteng cricketers